Aame Katha is a 1977 Telugu film directed by K. Raghavendra Rao starring Murali Mohan and Jayasudha in the title role.
It also featured Rajinikanth in a guest role. Jayasudha won Filmfare Award for Best Actress - Telugu  for her performance in the film.

Cast 
 Murali Mohan 
 Jayasudha 
 Rajinikanth
 Prabha
 Sripriya

Soundtrack

Awards
 Filmfare Award for Best Actress - Telugu - Jayasudha - won

Impact 
Jayasudha considers Aame Katha along with Jyothi and Premalekhalu as the film that "made her a star."

References

External links 
 

1977 films
Films directed by K. Raghavendra Rao
Films scored by K. Chakravarthy
1970s Telugu-language films